Marcel Moreau (16 April 1933 − 4 April 2020) was a Belgian writer. He was born in Boussu, a town in the mining region of Borinage in Hainaut Province, into a working-class environment. He described it as "a pure cultural void" with "a total absence of any cultural reference point". He lost his father at the age of 15, and abandoned his studies a short time later. He worked in various trades before becoming an accountant's assistant in Brussels for the newspaper Le Peuple. In 1955 he became a proof-reader for the daily Le Soir. 

Marcel Moreau married in 1957 and fathered two children. In 1963 he published his first novel, Quintes, notably praised by Simone de Beauvoir. Then followed Bannière de bave (Dribble Banner, 1965), La terre infestée d'hommes (Earth Infested with Men, 1966) and Le chant des paroxysmes (The Sound of Paroxysms, 1967). He moved to Paris in 1968, where he continued proof-reading. He worked for Alpha Encyclopédie, then for Le Parisien in 1971, and later for Le Figaro, until 1989. He travelled widely, to the USSR, India, Cameroon, China, Iran, Nepal, Canada, Mexico, the United States. He was friends with such cultural figures as Roland Topor, Anaïs Nin, Jean Dubuffet and Jean Paulhan. Considered a marginal writer with an idiosyncratic style, he was the author of a considerable body of work.

He died in Bobigny (a suburb of Paris), on 4 April 2020, of COVID-19 during the pandemic.

Bibliography

 Quintes, Buchet-Chastel, 1962 (published in the United States as The Selves of Quinte 1965)
 Bannière de bave, Gallimard, 1966
 La Terre infestée d'hommes, Buchet-Chastel, 1966
 Le chant des paroxysmes, Buchet-Chastel, 1967
 Écrits du fonds de l'amour, Buchet-Chastel, 1968
 Julie ou la dissolution, C. Bourgois, 1971
 La Pensée mongole, Christian Bourgois, 1972; Ether vague, 1991
 L'Ivre livre, Christian Bourgois, 1973
 Le Bord de mort, Christian Bourgois, 1974
 Les Arts viscéraux, Christian Bourgois, 1975; Ether vague, 1994
 Sacre de la femme, Christian Bourgois, 1977; Ether vague (corrected and revised edition), 1991
 Discours contre les entraves, C. Bourgois, 1979
 A dos de Dieu ou l'ordure lyrique, Luneau Ascot, 1980
 Orgambide scènes de la vie perdante, Luneau Ascot, 1980
 Moreaumachie, Buchet-Chastel, 1982
 Cahier caniculaires, Lettres Vives, 1982
 Kamalalam, L'Age d'homme, 1982
 Saulitude, photographs by Christian Calméjane, Accent, 1982
 Incandescence and Egobiographie tordue, Labor, 1984
 Monstre, Luneau Ascot, 1986
 Issue sans issue, Ether vague, 1986 & 1996
 Le Grouilloucouillou, in collaboration with Roland Topor, Atelier Clot, Bramsen et Georges, 1987
 Treize portraits, in collaboration with Antonio Saura, Atelier Clot, Bramsen, et Georges, 1987
 Amours à en mourir, Lettres Vives, 1988
 Opéra gouffre, La Pierre d'Alun, 1988
 Mille voix rauques, Buchet-Chastel, 1989
 Neung, conscience fiction, L'Ether Vague, 1990
 L'Œuvre Gravé, Didier Devillez, 1992
 Chants de la tombée des jours, Cadex, 1992
 Le charme et l'épouvante, La Différence, 1992
 Noces de mort, Lettres Vives, 1993
 Stéphane Mandelbaum, D. Devillez, 1992
 Tombeau pour les enténébrés, L'Ether Vague, 1993
 Bal dans la tête, La Différence, 1995
 La compagnie des femmes, Lettres Vives, 1996
 Insensément ton corps, Cadex, 1997
 Quintes, Mihaly, 1998
 La jeune fille et son fou, Lettres vives, 1998
 Extase pour une infante roumaine, Lettres Vives, 1998
 La vie de Jéju'', Actes Sud, 1998

References

1933 births
2020 deaths
Belgian writers in French
20th-century Belgian novelists
Belgian male novelists
People from Boussu
20th-century Belgian male writers
Deaths from the COVID-19 pandemic in France